Roger Blake West (May 10, 1928 – January 24, 1978) was a United States district judge of the United States District Court for the Eastern District of Louisiana.

Education and career

Born in New Orleans, Louisiana, West received a Bachelor of Arts degree from Tulane University in 1949 and a Bachelor of Laws from Tulane University Law School in 1951. He was in private practice in New Orleans from 1951 to 1971.

Federal judicial service

On April 14, 1971, West was nominated by President Richard Nixon to a new seat on the United States District Court for the Eastern District of Louisiana created by 84 Stat. 294. He was confirmed by the United States Senate on June 18, 1971, and received his commission on June 22, 1971. West served in that capacity until his death on January 24, 1978.

References

Sources
 

1928 births
1978 deaths
Judges of the United States District Court for the Eastern District of Louisiana
United States district court judges appointed by Richard Nixon
20th-century American judges
Tulane University alumni
Tulane University Law School alumni
Lawyers from New Orleans